Cadotte Pass, known in the mid to late 1800s as Cadotte's Pass, is a pass in the Rocky Mountains located on the Continental Divide in the U.S. state of Montana. Pierre Cadotte, a white settler at Fort Benton, Montana, explored the pass in 1851. Prior to his exploration Tribal people utilized the pass while migrating to the buffalo hunting plains around the Sun River. Isaac Stevens, Governor of Washington Territory, named the pass after Cadotte in 1853.

See also
List of mountain passes in Montana

Cited references

Landforms of Lewis and Clark County, Montana
Mountain passes of Montana